Continental Rifts: Contemporary Time-based Works of Africa was a contemporary art show at UCLA's Fowler Museum held February through June 2009.

Bibliography

External links 

 

Art exhibitions in the United States
2009 in art
Art in Greater Los Angeles